The Bull Page Stakes is a Thoroughbred horse race run annually in mid October at Woodbine Racetrack in Toronto, Ontario, Canada.

An Ontario Sire Stakes, it is a restricted race for two-year-old Colts and Geldings. It is raced over a distance of 6 furlongs on Polytrack and currently carries a purse of $125,000.

Inaugurated in 1976 as a five-and-a-half furlong sprint, it was modified to its present six furlong distance in 1980.

The race was named to honor E. P. Taylor's 1951 Canadian Horse of the Year and important sire, Bull Page.

The race was run in two divisions in 1979.

Records
Speed  record: (at current distance of 6 furlongs) 
  1:08.84 - Not Bourbon (2007) (new stakes and track record)

Most wins by an owner:
 2 - Kingsbrook Farm (1983, 1993)
 2 - Sam-Son Farm (1984, 1996)
 2 - Woodford Racing LLC (2006, 2009)

Most wins by a jockey:
 6 - Patrick Husbands (2006, 2009, 2010, 2011, 2013, 2014)

Most wins by a trainer:
 3 - Ralph Biamonte (2011, 2012, 2013)
 3 - Robert Tiller (1988, 2014, 2016)
 2 - Glenn Magnusson (1982, 1992)
 2 - Roger Attfield (1989, 2007)
 2 - Michael J. Doyle (1993, 2002)
 2 - Mark E. Casse (2006, 2009)

Winners

References
 The Bull Page Stakes at Woodbine Entertainment Group

Ontario Sire Stakes
Ungraded stakes races in Canada
Flat horse races for two-year-olds
Recurring sporting events established in 1976
Woodbine Racetrack
1976 establishments in Ontario